J. Landis Martin, also known as Lanny Martin, (born c. 1946) is an American lawyer, businessman, and philanthropist. He was the chief executive officer of NL Industries from 1987 to 2003. He is the founder and managing director of Platte River Ventures, a private equity firm.

Early life
J. Landis Martin was born circa 1946 in Grand Island, Nebraska. He graduated from Northwestern University, where he earned a bachelor's degree in 1968, followed by a Juris Doctor in 1973.

Career
Martin began his career as a lawyer for Kirkland & Ellis from 1973 to 1987. He was the chief executive officer of NL Industries, a public company listed on the New York Stock Exchange, from 1987 to 2003. In 2005, he founded Platte River Ventures, a private equity firm based in Cherry Creek, Denver. Martin serves as its managing director. He is also the founding chairman of Crown Castle International Corp.

Martin was inducted into the Colorado Business Hall of Fame in 2012.

Philanthropy
Martin is a patron of the arts. With his wife, he donated $25 million to the Denver Art Museum in 2006 and "more than $3 million" to the Clyfford Still Museum in 2011. He is chairman emeritus of the Central City Opera House Association and the Houston Grand Opera.

Martin maintains close ties to his alma mater, Northwestern University. In 2013, he donated $15 million to the university for the construction of a new "athletics complex". Additionally, he has served as the chairman of the board of trustees of the university since June 2017.

Personal life
Martin has a wife, Sharon, and three children.

References

Living people
1946 births
People from Grand Island, Nebraska
Lawyers from Denver
Northwestern University alumni
American company founders
American chief executives
Philanthropists from Colorado
People associated with Kirkland & Ellis
20th-century American lawyers